Barbarian Princess is the second in a historical fiction trilogy about the 1st-century Roman Empire. Set primarily in Roman Britain circa AD 76–79, it follows the adventures of a pair of Roman brothers - one free-born and one slave-born - as they serve in the Roman legions.

Plot summary
Correus Appius Julianus is the slave born son of retired Roman general Flavius Appius Julianus who is currently posted as a centurion to the Legio II Augusta in Western Britain under the command of provincial governor Sextus Julius Frontinus. The novel opens with Correus returning from a spying expedition to some of the local British tribes, one of which, the Silures, will provide the main antagonist in the person of their king Bendigeid.

Upon returning to his legion, Correus loses his German mistress Freita to the knife of a Briton trying to kill the governor. He is subsequently involved in a battle against the tribe that killed his Freita and must also find time to rescue his half-brother Flavius Appius Julianus, his father's heir with whom he has an uneasy and somewhat adversarial relationship, from the Silures' allies. And Correus also must come to grips with his increasing interest in the governor's hostage - a young British princess named Ygerna who has been given into his care to Romanize. In the meantime, the tribes of western Britain try to survive the governor's attempt to tie them up into the Roman Empire.

Trivia
The Centurions trilogy was written by Amanda Cockrell writing under the pseudonym Damion Hunter. In her own name, Ms. Cockrell also has written a separate non-fiction book called Legions of the Mist about the Legio IX Hispana which was stationed in the modern-day city of York during this period and whose actions play a large, albeit off-stage role, in the events covered in Barbarian Princess. The other two books in the series are the eponymous The Centurions which begin the tale of the two brothers and their extended family and The Emperor's Games, which is the final book in the unfinished series. It is unknown why the series never continued past the third book as it was clearly intended to be a much lengthier tale, though the most probable reasons are a lack of consumer interest or a change of direction from either the publisher or the author.

References

The Centurions Trilogy
1982 American novels
Ballantine Books books